Sylvanus Blanchard "Samuel" Newton (December 4, 1868 – April 30, 1932) was an American football player and coach.  He served as the head football coach at Pennsylvania State University (1896–1898), Lafayette College (1899–1901, 1911), Lehigh University (1902–1905), and Williams College (1907, 1909–1910), compiling a career college football coaching record of 83–58–5.

Coaching career

Penn State
Newton was the head football coach at Pennsylvania State University from 1896 to 1898. His career record at Penn State was 12–14.

Lafayette
Newton coached at Lafayette College for five seasons and achieved a record of 36–16.  His first season was arguably his best, as his team outscored its opponents by 253 to 23 and achieved a record of 12–1.  The team's only loss was to Princeton by a score of 12–0.

Lehigh
Newton was the tenth head football coach at Lehigh University and he held that position for four seasons, from 1902 until 1905.
His overall record at Lehigh was 23–20–2.  While coaching at Lafayette, Newton's teams won The Rivalry game against Lehigh all seven times in three seasons.  Newton later moved to Lehigh to coach on the opposite side of The Rivalry, winning two of four games played.

Death
Newton died on April 30, 1932 of a throat infection at his home in Chevy Chase, Maryland.  He is interred at Arlington National Cemetery in Arlington, Virginia.

Head coaching record

Notes

References

1868 births
1932 deaths
American football ends
Lafayette Leopards football coaches
Lehigh Mountain Hawks football coaches
Penn Quakers football players
Penn State Nittany Lions football coaches
Williams Ephs football coaches
Perelman School of Medicine at the University of Pennsylvania alumni
Williams College alumni
People from Yarmouth, Maine
Burials at Arlington National Cemetery